James Backhouse Walker,  (14 October 1841 – 4 November 1899) was an Australian solicitor and historian.

Life 
James Backhouse Walker, the eldest son of George Washington Walker, was born at Hobart. He was educated at the High School, Hobart, and the Quaker Bootham School, York.

He was employed as a junior clerk in his father’s Hobart Savings Bank and in 1872 took articles and was admitted as barrister, solicitor and proctor of the Supreme Court of Tasmania in 1876. His social commitment was evident in his many pursuits. He sought improved conditions for workers as secretary of the working men's club. He was a member of various educational boards and in 1889 proposed an examining university as the first step towards a teaching university. In the following year he was appointed member of the first council of the new university and in 1898 became its second vice-chancellor. He was elected to the council of the Royal Society of Tasmania in 1888.

History of Tasmania 
Walker was a trustee of the Tasmanian Public Library. He was the author of several brochures on the history of his native colony, taken chiefly from official sources: viz. "The French in Van Diemen's Land" (Hobart, 1889); "The Settlement of Tasmania, comprising Papers read before the Royal Society of Tasmania" (Hobart, 1890); "The Discovery and Occupation of Port Dalrymple" (Hobart, 1890). His papers on the discovery, early settlement and Aboriginal inhabitants of Tasmania, published in 1902 became a standard authority.

The Law School of the University of Tasmania commemorates him with the J. B. Walker Memorial Prize.
Quakers in Australia commemorate his contribution to learning and social justice with an annual Backhouse Lecture.

References

People educated at Bootham School
1841 births
1899 deaths
19th-century Australian historians